Sollega is a US-based solar racking company that provides flat- and ground-mount solar arrays for commercial and industrial use. Sollega operates out of The Mission District in San Francisco, California.

History
The company was founded in 2009 by Elie Rothschild, an individual with 7 years of experience in the solar energy field. Sollega proposed a cheaper alternative to conventional metal solar panel mounting systems. The company produced its first racking system, the Instarack 15°. This was followed by the Instarack 10°. These were replaced with the updated Fastrack 5° in 2012. In 2014, this was replaced by the current system, the Fastrack 510.

Major Installations

• Hawaii- 2.4 mW array at Hawaii Airports

• St. Maarten- 800 kW array

• Dorado, Puerto Rico- 872 kW array

• Renton, Washington- 1.125 mW array

Products

The current racking system provided by Sollega is the Fastrack 510. It can mount both 5° and 10° arrays and is designed to be anchored using anchors and/or ballast. The individual units are made out of lightweight high density polyethylene plastic (HDPE) with a minimum of 35% recycled content.

References

Companies based in San Francisco
Solar energy companies of the United States